The Remington Model 552 Speedmaster is a blow-back operated, self-loading, semi-automatic rifle that can fire .22 Short, .22 Long and .22 long rifle cartridges.  Ammunition is fed from a tubular magazine under the barrel.

History and Features
First introduced in 1957, the model 552 features a self-loading, blowback action featuring a low profile left-side bolt handle that lends itself to a clean receiver appearance and slender profile.  The rifle is equipped with both open sights and a 3/8" (9.5 mm) dovetail rail for mounting a scope and a safety on the trigger guard.  The Speedmaster was manufactured from 1957 to 1988 in a standard model. In 1966 Remington offered this rifle with a special stamping of the company's 150th anniversary on the left side of the receiver.

In 1991, the walnut butt stock of the BDL Deluxe version was altered to incorporate a Monte Carlo comb to improve cheek weld when using the rifle with a telescopic sight, while the impressed checkering on the butt stock and forearm was changed to machine-cut checkering.  in 2017, after complaints that the Monte Carlo comb made the rifle difficult to use with open sights, Remington returned to a straight comb stock design for current production BDL rifles.

Current Production 
The Speedmaster is still produced in an upgraded "BDL" model, featuring a checkered walnut butt stock and forearm with a gloss finish.

References

External links
 (Civilian products website)
 (Law enforcement products website)
 (Military products website)

Remington Arms firearms
.22 LR semi-automatic rifles